Dayanatpur is a village in the Hapur District of the state of Uttar Pradesh, India. It is one of the last stops towards the river Ganges from the New Delhi side. The historic Kuchesar Fort lies just a couple of miles from the small settlement of Dayanatpur.Near Indian Oil Petrol Pump Dayanatpur.

See also
Dayanatpur
Hapur

Villages in Hapur district